Laurie Clifford Duncan (born 2 May 1991) is an English television actor best known for his role as Callum Kane on the British soap opera Hollyoaks.

Early life
Laurie was born in Archway, London. He studied performing arts at the Arts Depot in Finchley and became part of the Young Actors Theatre in Islington.  Duncan told Digital Spy "Acting is something that I've always wanted to do, for as long as I can remember. I remember being at primary school and doing a play, and that was probably the first time when I thought it could be for me."
Duncan is also a fan of Arsenal F.C.

Career
Duncan's break through role was on the ITV drama series Law & Order UK as troubled teen Danny Heywood.

He is best known for his role as Callum Kane on the Channel 4 British soap opera Hollyoaks. Laurie joined the Hollyoaks cast in September 2011 and has described his time on the show as "absolutely fantastic so far." And added "We have the best fun here, and I've met some of the best friends that I've ever made. It's a brilliant place to work."
Duncan has described his Hollyoaks character Callum "A bit of a mystery man. He doesn't really care about anyone else. The way he thinks is, you lot can conform, but I'm happy reading my books. He doesn't like socialising. He doesn't want to be perceived as cool, but for some reason people think he's cool." "I think, most of the time, Callum is the kind of character who just doesn't really want to be bothered by anything or anyone. He wants to do his own thing, get on with his own life, and he's very introverted" but "Callum is very caring deep down."

Duncan has stated that "Callum's not like me at all, I talk all the time! It's a bit strange for an actor because it's usually all about the dramatic stuff, shouting and crying. Ever since I got the part I've begun reading lots of poetry – because Callum reads a lot of poetry, I thought I'd do a bit of research." "He reads a lot of Bukowski and I haven't put the book down for about three days. He's very dark and very abstract." Laurie has also confessed that he "doesn't get" Callum's heart-throb status "That's Callum, not me."

Duncan joined the Army Reserve in 2016 and is currently serving with the Honourable Artillery Company based in the City of London.

Filmography

References

External links 
 

1991 births
English male soap opera actors
Living people
People from Archway, London